
Tongue End is a small village in the South Holland district of Lincolnshire, England.

Tongue End comprises Victorian red-brick farmworkers' cottages and early 20th-century former council houses. It once had a village school (built in 1876), and three public houses.

The name is said to refer to the shape of the land between the rivers Glen and Bourne Eau. There is a location on the Stamford Canal which is similarly formed and has the same name.

Tongue End falls within the drainage area of the Welland and Deepings Internal Drainage Board. Gilbert Heathcote's tunnel drained into the Counter Drain nearby.

See also
 Bourne Eau
 Counter Drain railway station

References

External links

The Deepings
Hamlets in Lincolnshire
South Holland, Lincolnshire